Route 350 is a  long east–west secondary highway in the northeast portion of New Brunswick, Canada.

The route's eastern terminus is in the community of Bois-Blanc. The road travels east to the community of Haut-Sainte-Rose. The route then continues to the community of Sainte-Rose before continuing to Sainte-Rose-Gloucester. The routes ends in the community of Six-Roads at Route 113.

Intersecting routes
no major ones

See also

References

355
355